Matthew Chau (born 9 November 1994) is an Australian badminton player. He was four times men's doubles Oceania Champion winning in 2015–2018. Chau competed in the men's doubles at the 2016 Summer Olympics alongside Sawan Serasinghe.

Chau picked up his first badminton racquet at age 10, following his parents to the Monash University Badminton Club where they played socially. The now 22-year-old fell in love with the all rounded nature of the sport and says he enjoys that badminton demands speed, strength, endurance, skill, tactical smarts and hard work from its athletes. Chau first partnered with Serasinghe at the 2013 Australian Youth Olympic Festival and the duo went on to secure the Rio quota spot for Australia by winning the 2016 Oceania Championships title.

Chau also took home the men’s doubles title with Serasinghe at the Waikato International tournament and competed at his first World Championships 2016 at just 20 years old in Jakarta, Indonesia.

When he is not playing, Chau studies a Bachelor of Commerce and Bachelor of Engineering and enjoys cooking.

Achievements

Oceania Championships 
Men's doubles

Mixed doubles

BWF International Challenge/Series (2 titles, 3 runners-up) 
Men's doubles

Mixed doubles

  BWF International Challenge tournament
  BWF International Series tournament
  BWF Future Series tournament

References

External links 

 
 
 
 
 
 
 

1994 births
Living people
Sportsmen from Victoria (Australia)
Australian people of Chinese descent
Australian male badminton players
Badminton players at the 2016 Summer Olympics
Olympic badminton players of Australia
Badminton players at the 2018 Commonwealth Games
Commonwealth Games competitors for Australia
People from Mount Waverley, Victoria
Sportspeople from Melbourne